"Los Amantes" (Spanish for "The Lovers") is the second single released by Spanish pop band Mecano in 1988 under Ariola Records, for their fifth studio album Descanso Dominical (1988). It became a great success in Spain and also in Latin America.

In 2006, band singer Ana Torroja re-recorded the song, giving it a mid-2000s pop sound for her album Me Cuesta Tanto Olvidarte (2006). Torroja's new version received airplay and gave the song some fame again.

Formats 
7" inch single

12" Maxisingle

References 

1988 singles
Spanish pop songs